Byron Davis (born 8 October 1973) is a squash coach and former professional squash player from Australia.

As a player, his most notable successes came in doubles play. He won the men's doubles title at the World Doubles Squash Championships in 2004 (partnering Cameron White), and was a men's doubles silver medalist at the 1998 Commonwealth Games (partnering Rodney Eyles). He reached a career-high world ranking of World No. 14 in 1998.

He is was the Australian National Head Coach.

External links 
 
 

1973 births
Living people
Australian male squash players
Commonwealth Games silver medallists for Australia
Commonwealth Games medallists in squash
Squash players at the 1998 Commonwealth Games
Medallists at the 1998 Commonwealth Games